The 93rd Pennsylvania House of Representatives District is located in South Central Pennsylvania and has been represented by Mike Jones since 2019.

District profile
The 93rd District is located in York County and includes the following areas: 

Cross Roads
Dallastown
East Hopewell Township
Fawn Grove
Fawn Township
Hopewell Township
Jacobus
Loganville
North Hopewell Township
Shrewsbury
Springfield Township
Stewartstown
Winterstown
Yoe
York Township

Representatives

References

Government of York County, Pennsylvania
93